Saribas District is the old name for what is now called Spaoh District. The name derives from the Saribas river flowing through the Spaoh district.

Betong District